Mount Sanford of south-central Connecticut, est. Mount Sanford is part of the narrow, linear Metacomet Ridge that extends from Long Island Sound near New Haven, north through the Connecticut River Valley of Massachusetts to the Vermont border. The Metacomet Ridge continues north from Mount Sanford as Peck Mountain and south as Mad Mare Hill and West Rock Ridge.

Recreation and conservation
The ridgeline of Mount Sanford is traversed by the  Quinnipiac Trail; the summit of the mountain lies within the Naugatuck State Forest.

Adjacent summits

Nearby summits include Peck Mountain to the north, Sleeping Giant to the southeast and West Rock Ridge to the south.

See also
 Metacomet Ridge
 Adjacent summits:

References
 Farnsworth, Elizabeth J. "Metacomet-Mattabesett Trail Natural Resource Assessment."  2004. PDF webfile cited November 1, 2007. 
 Connecticut Walk Book: A Trail Guide to the Connecticut Outdoors. 17th Edition. The Connecticut Forest and Park Association. Rockfall, Connecticut. Undated.
 Raymo, Chet and Raymo, Maureen E. Written in Stone: A Geologic History of the Northeastern United States. Globe Pequot, Chester, Connecticut, 1989.

Bethany, Connecticut
Cheshire, Connecticut
Mountains of Connecticut
Metacomet Ridge, Connecticut
Landforms of New Haven County, Connecticut